Siletz Valley Early College Academy, also known as Siletz Valley School, is a public charter high school in Siletz, Oregon, United States. The school opened in 2006 with funding from the Chinook Winds Casino. and from a grant provided by the Bill and  Melinda Gates Foundation.

Academics
In 2008, 67% of the school's seniors received a high school diploma. Of 21 students, 14 graduated, five dropped out, and two were still in high school the following year.

References

High schools in Lincoln County, Oregon
Educational institutions established in 2006
Public high schools in Oregon
Charter schools in Oregon
2006 establishments in Oregon